The SQL/MED ("Management of External Data") extension to the SQL standard is defined by ISO/IEC 9075-9:2008 (originally defined for SQL:2003). SQL/MED provides extensions to SQL that define foreign-data wrappers and datalink types to allow SQL to manage external data. External data is data that is accessible to, but not managed by, an SQL-based DBMS. This standard can be used in the development of federated database systems.

Implementations
 PostgreSQL has support for some SQL/MED since version 9.1.
 LucidDB has support for SQL/MED.
 MariaDB has support for SQL/MED with the CONNECT storage engine. The implementation uses different syntax than the official standard.
 Farrago has support for SQL/MED.
 IBM Db2 has support for SQL/MED.
 Teiid has support for SQL/MED.

See also
SQL
SQL:2008
SQL:2003

References

External links
 SQL/MED - A Status Report

SQL